The Civil Aviation Authority of Singapore (CAAS) is Singapore's civil aviation authority and a statutory board under the Ministry of Transport of the Government of Singapore. Its head office is located on the fourth storey of Singapore Changi Airport's Terminal 2.

Overview
Established on 1 September 1984, the CAAS regulates civilian air traffic within the airspace jurisdiction of the Republic. It also helps enable the growth of the air hub and aviation industry in Singapore, promotes safe industry practices and engages in civilian air-service agreements with air-service operators. This includes the usage of unmanned aerial vehicles (UAVs) such as drones and quadcopters by individuals or organisations.

CAAS also operates the Air Traffic Control Tower, providing air navigation services to ensure faultless movements of civilian aircraft at Singapore's airports and in the Singapore flight information region (FIR).

The CAAS also issues revenue stamps to pay for the passenger service charge on flights.

In July 2017, CAAS and the European Aviation Safety Agency (EASA) entered into a working arrangement to recognize each other's certifications.

CAAS is led by Director-General Mr Kevin Shum, with Mr Edmund Cheng serving as the board's Chairman.

See also

 Aviation safety
 Singapore Aviation Academy
 Singapore Changi Airport
Jarnail Singh

References

External links
 
 Infopedia
 Flight Information Region In Singapore	

2009 establishments in Singapore
Government agencies established in 2009
Singapore
Civil aviation in Singapore
Statutory boards of the Singapore Government
Air navigation service providers
Transport organisations based in Singapore
Regulation in Singapore